Archibald Clavering Gunter (25 October 1847 – 24 February 1907) was a British-American writer primarily known today for authoring the novel that the film A Florida Enchantment was based upon, and for his hand in popularizing "Casey at the Bat". He clipped the original publication of the poem from the San Francisco Examiner and passed it on to DeWolf Hopper, whose performances brought it fame.

Born in Liverpool, Gunter's family emigrated to the United States when he was six and settled in San Francisco. In 1879 he moved to New York.
Gunter was a playwright and prolific self-published novelist, novels that were translated into other languages and adapted several times into films. His Home Publishing Company also published Gunter's Magazine (1905–1907), featuring short fiction or serialized novels by himself and others. He also published others' novels, including ones by Richard Henry Savage and Gilbert Parker.

Selected works
1872 – Found the True Vein, a play dealing with life in a mining camp
1880 – Two Nights in Rome, a play
1881 – Fresh, the American, a comedy about a Yankee who rescues an Egyptian harem girl
1886 – Prince Karl, written as serious drama, actor Richard Mansfield recast it as a farce
1887 – Mr. Barnes of New York, a book about an adventurer, allegedly sold three million copies, though certainly was quite popular even if sales claims were inflated.  Adapted to film in 1914 and again in 1922.
1888 – Mr. Potter of Texas
1889 – That Frenchman
1890 – Miss Nobody of Nowhere
1890 – Small Boys in Big Boots
1892 – My Official Wife, play adaptation of novel by Richard Henry Savage
1892 – Miss Dividends
1893 – Baron Montez of Panama and Paris
1893 – A Florida Enchantment
1894 – A Princess in Paris
1894 – The Kings Stockbrother
1895 – The First of the English
1897 – Susan Turnbull; or, The Power of Woman, a novel set at Dr. Andrew Turnbull's New Smyrna settlement

References

Burt, Daniel S. (2009) The chronology of American literature: America's literary achievements from the colonial era to modern times, pp. 244, 260, 269, 271. Houghton Mifflin Harcourt.

Sources
Author and Bookinfo.com

External links

 
 

1847 births
1907 deaths
19th-century American novelists
American male novelists
American male dramatists and playwrights
19th-century American dramatists and playwrights
19th-century American male writers
19th-century British novelists
19th-century British dramatists and playwrights
19th-century British male writers
British male novelists
British male dramatists and playwrights
People from Liverpool